The year 2010 is the 16th year in the history of Fighting Network Rings, a mixed martial arts promotion based in Japan. In 2010 Fighting Network Rings held 5 events beginning with, Rings: The Outsider 10.

Events list

Rings: The Outsider 10

Rings: The Outsider 10 was an event held on February 14, 2010 at The Differ Ariake Arena in Tokyo, Japan.

Results

Rings: The Outsider 11

Rings: The Outsider 11 was an event held on April 3, 2010 at The Differ Ariake Arena in Tokyo, Japan.

Results

Rings: The Outsider 12

Rings: The Outsider 12 was an event held on June 20, 2010 at The Differ Ariake Arena in Tokyo, Japan.

Results

Rings: The Outsider 13

Rings: The Outsider 13 was an event held on October 11, 2010 at The Yokohama Cultural Gymnasium in Yokohama, Kanagawa, Japan.

Results

Rings: The Outsider 14

Rings: The Outsider 14 was an event held on December 4, 2010 at The Differ Ariake Arena in Tokyo, Japan.

Results

See also 
 Fighting Network Rings
 List of Fighting Network Rings events

References

Fighting Network Rings events
2010 in mixed martial arts